Roxton may refer to one of these places:

Canada
Roxton, Quebec, a township that surrounds the village of Roxton Falls
Roxton Falls, Quebec, a village
Roxton Pond, Quebec, a municipality in La Haute-Yamaska Regional County Municipality

United Kingdom
Roxton, Bedfordshire, England

United States
Roxton, Texas, Lamar County, Texas

See also
Rixton (disambiguation)